The 1945 Bowling Green Falcons football team was an American football team that represented Bowling Green State College (later renamed Bowling Green State University) as an independent during the 1945 college football season. In its fifth season under head coach Robert Whittaker, the team compiled a 4–3 record and was outscored by a total of 81 to 79. Patrick Mulvihill was the team captain. The team played its home games at University Stadium in Bowling Green, Ohio.

Schedule

References

Bowling Green
Bowling Green Falcons football seasons
Bowling Green Falcons football